Nelson Repenning is an American business scholar, currently the School of Management Distinguished Professor of Systems Dynamics and Organization Studies at MIT Sloan School of Management.

References

Year of birth missing (living people)
Living people
MIT Sloan School of Management faculty